Preston Brown is a former professional American football player who played wide receiver for the New England Patriots, New York Jets, and Cleveland Browns.

References

1958 births
American football wide receivers
New England Patriots players
New York Jets players
Cleveland Browns players
Vanderbilt Commodores football players
Living people
Players of American football from Nashville, Tennessee